Josephine Hart, Baroness Saatchi (1 March 1942 – 2 June 2011), was an Irish writer, theatrical producer and television presenter who lived in London. Lady Saatchi wrote the novel Damage, which was the basis for the 1992 film of the same name, directed by Louis Malle and starring Jeremy Irons, Juliette Binoche and Rupert Graves.

Early years
Born at Mullingar, County Westmeath, she attended a convent school at Carrickmacross, County Monaghan, where she was encouraged by the nuns to recite verse at Irish festivals. She moved to London in 1964.

Career
Formerly a director of Haymarket Publishing, Hart was a founder of Gallery Poets and West End Poetry Hour. She produced several West End plays, including the Evening Standard Award winner The House of Bernarda Alba by Federico García Lorca.

She appeared on television as the presenter for the Thames TV series Books by My Bedside. Her papers are currently housed at the Howard Gotlieb Archival Research Center at Boston University.

Books
Damage, Vintage Books, 1991
Sin, Vintage Books, 1992
Oblivion, Vintage Books, 1995
The Stillest Day, Chatto & Windus, 1998
The Reconstructionist, Chatto & Windus, 2001
Catching Life by the Throat: Poems from Eight Great Poets, W. W. Norton, 2008
The Truth About Love, Virago, 2009

Personal life
Hart was married to Maurice Saatchi, advertising magnate and former political advisor with whom she had one son, Edward Saatchi. Maurice was granted a peerage and became Baron Saatchi and as a result, she was entitled to the title The Lady Saatchi. She also had a son Adam Buckley from a previous marriage.

Death
Lady Saatchi died, aged 69, from primary peritoneal cancer on 2 June 2011.

Legacy
Interest in Hart's poetry is maintained by the Josephine Hart Poetry Foundation, a registered charity under English law.

References

External links

 

1942 births
2011 deaths
20th-century British novelists
21st-century British novelists
20th-century Irish writers
20th-century Irish novelists
21st-century Irish novelists
British women television presenters
British theatre managers and producers
Women theatre managers and producers
Deaths from peritoneal cancer
Irish theatre managers and producers
Deaths from cancer in England
People from County Westmeath
Place of death missing
Saatchi family
Spouses of life peers
Saatchi
Irish women television presenters